Colm Mac Eochaidh (born 1963) is a judge of the General Court of the European Union.  He was a judge of the Irish High Court from 2012 to 2017.

He was educated at Coláiste Eoin, University College Dublin and King's Inns. He qualified as a barrister in 1987 and was made a Senior Counsel in 2009. He was appointed to the High Court in 2012.

In 1995 he and Michael Smith, the head of the environmental group An Taisce, sponsored a IR£10,000 reward for "information leading to the conviction on indictment of a person or persons for offences relating to land rezoning in the Republic of Ireland”.  They had been prompted to put up the reward after suspicions about the rezoning of land in Loughlinstown in 1991. James Gogarty, a retired employee of construction firm JSME, responded with information about payments to Ray Burke, a Government Minister and former Chairman of Dublin County Council. Following Burke's resignation from the cabinet, the Mahon Tribunal was set up. Initially set up to investigate illegal payments received by Burke, the tribunal ran from November 1997 to March 2012 investigating a number of cases arising from payments made to Burke.

A former member of Fine Gael, in the 2002 Irish general election he unsuccessfully ran in the constituency of Dublin South-East, as a running mate to sitting Fine Gael TD Frances Fitzgerald.

References

1963 births
Living people
People from County Dublin
High Court judges (Ireland)
General Court (European Union) judges
People educated at Coláiste Eoin
Irish judges of international courts and tribunals
Irish officials of the European Union
Alumni of King's Inns